Thavasi is a 2001 Indian Tamil-language action drama film directed by K. R. Udhayashankar starring Vijayakanth in dual lead roles, with Soundarya, Vadivelu, Jayasudha, Prathyusha, Nassar, Ponnambalam playing other pivotal roles. The film released on 14 November 2001 and received mixed reviews from the critics but was a hit at the box office. It was also dubbed in Hindi as Aaj Ka Krantiveer. The film was remade in Kannada as Mallikarjuna.

Plot
Thavasi is an influential do-gooder landlord in a small village, who commands respect from the village. Thavasi and his wife arrange for their son Boopathi's marriage with Priyadarshini. Sankarapandi, who sodomised and killed Thavasi's sister after marrying her, wants to marry his daughter (whom he had with his second wife) to Boopathi. Thavasi, since he doesn't want his son to marry his daughter, insults Sankarapandi. Sankarapandi instead to save his prestige, engages her daughter with Maragathammal's son Thangarasu, who is present there. Boopathi's engagement is done with  Priyadarshini, with both of them liking each other after many chance encounters. Thangarasu is accused of stealing temple owned jewels, and Thavasi judges him to be guilty. The next day Thangarasu commits suicide. It is implied that Thangarasu is innocent and took his own life since he couldn't live with the blame. Later a mute person is arrested as the person who stole the jewel. Hearing this Thangarasu's mother Maragathammal questions Thavasi's judgement, which was said to be never wrong. Thavasi decides to give away his own son Boopathi to Maragathammal, for his injustice to her son. Maragathammal despises Boopathi and treats him like badly, though he tolerates it. Sankarapandi wants his daughter to marry Boopathi, who is now the son of Maragathammal, as engaged. Boopathi, unknown to Maragathammal, saves Thanagarasu's imbecile sister from Maragathammal's brother Kottai Perumal's sexual assaulting and also reforms Karmegam, who is the brother in law of Thangarasu, who constantly tortures his wife for due dowry. In a chance encounter before his marriage with Sankarapandi's daughter, he meets the mute thief and realises that he acted as a mute. He captures him and makes him confess that Sankarapandi was responsible for theft of Temple's jewel and Thangarasu's murder, who made it look like suicide. In the end, Boopathi marries Priya and Priya gets pregnant with twins.

Cast

Vijayakanth as Thavasi and Boopathi (dual role)
Soundarya as Priyadarshini
Jayasudha as Thavasi's wife and Boopathi's mother
Prathyusha as Nandhini
Nassar as Sankarapandi
Vadivelu as Azhagu
Delhi Ganesh as Kanakku Pillai
Nizhalgal Ravi as Rajadurai, Priyadarshini's father
Ganthimathi as Priyadarshini's grandmother
Vadivukkarasi as Maragathammal, Thangarasu's mother
Kuyili as Sankarapandi's wife
Eswari Rao as Gowri, Maragathammal's daughter
Soumiya as Soumiya, Priya's friend
Aishwarya as Kaveri, Maragathammal's daughter
Ponnambalam as Kottai Perumal, Maragathammal's brother
Thyagu as Sankarapandi's henchman
Sriman as Thangarasu, Maragathammal's son
Mahanadi Shankar as Ezhumalai
Ilavarasu as Karmegam, Maragathammal's son-in-law
Soundar as Auto rickshaw driver
Mayilsamy as Fraud
G. V. Sudhakar Naidu as Sundarapandian
Rajkumar as Chinna Pandi
Sempuli Jagan as Kannaian
Rajajirajan as Man vomiting blood
Scissor Manohar as Servant
Set Govindaraj as Govind
Sampath Ram as Thief
A. C. Murali Mohan as Collector
Master Naveen as Naughty boy
Shathiga as Gowri's daughter
Krishnamoorthy as Mentally challenged man
Bonda Mani as Shop owner
Muthukaalai as Coconut seller
Jayamani as Son of the death father
Kottachi as Villager
Citizen Mani as Villager
Karnaa Radha as Villager

Production

The first phase of shooting of Thavasi started in Chennai and continued in Pollachi and Udumalpet. Song sequences involving Vijayakanth and Soundharya were shot in Kerala and Kodaikanal. Kumbakonam Mahamaham tank was specially designed for Thavasi as its grandest set. Around 10,000 junior artistes participated in the holy dip. Around 30 artistes performed them while nine cameras whirred from all directions to roll.

Soundtrack
Soundtrack was composed by Vidyasagar.

Reception
The film received mixed reviews. This film became a "Hit" at box office.

Rediff wrote, "Trouble is, everyone of them have gone through the selfsame motions so often in the past that they seem to sleepwalk through this film, doing their stuff by rote and with little conviction. The crisis is predictable, ditto the denouement. And the fights, songs and comedy tracks that bridge crisis and denouement fail to grip."

Bizhat wrote, "Director Udayasankar has done justice in the screenplay and direction area (except for the climax). The last one reel is filled with masala and it is very cinematic."

Lolluexpress.com wrote, "Although Thavasi has the same old story line the movie was enjoyable to watch. Vijaykanth's matured acting and Soundarya's Screen presence were simply superb. A couple of songs were really sweet to hear. Nasser came out with yet another Outstanding performance as he usually does. Vadivelu's comedy was really good. So the movie has various features that can be enjoyed by everyone and was not like other "ARVA KOLARU" movies. These kind of movies can be watched and enjoyed and the movie came at the right time. The movie for sure is a hit movie just because it gave us everything what people expect."

Balaji Balasubramaniam of Thiraipadam.com wrote, "Vijayakanth doesn't do much to differentiate between his two roles with respect to gestures or mannerisms and so its just the make-up that does the job. The special effects director too has little to do with the two roles rarely appearing in the same frame. Soundarya looks cute while Jayasudha, appearing in Tamil after a long time, is adequate as the dutiful wife and affectionate mother. Acting honors go to Nasser who manages to jazz up another routine villainous role with a nice smirk while taunting Vijayakanth. Nasser enjoys himself in the scene where he confronts Vijayakanth at the marriage hall. Vadivelu's individual encounters with the mad man are loud and unfunny but he is tolerable when paired with Vijayakanth. Pratyuksha is on hand for a single duet. Vidyasagar has had some hit soundtracks recently but Thavasi is definitely not going to be added to the list."

Awards and nominations 
2001 Tamil Nadu State Film Awards
Best Comedian - Vadivelu
Best Music Director - Vidyasagar (also for his music in Dhill and Poovellam Un Vasam)

References

External links
Thavasi at Jointscene

2001 films
Tamil films remade in other languages
2000s Tamil-language films
Films scored by Vidyasagar